Faculte de Theologie Evangelique de Boma is a Christian college located in Boma, Congo. It is an official school of the Christian and Missionary Alliance.

History
With the help of the Christianity and Missionary Alliance in the USA and Canada, the Evangelical Community of the Alliance in Congo launched the Boma Seminary in September 1976.
Three students were part of the first class: Esaron Lelo Mavinga, Dynobert Nlandu Nguala and Justin-Abraham Kumbu-ki-Makaya.

With a teaching faculty of three full-time professors, Raymur Downey, Lammert Hukema, and Britta Hukema, and one visiting professor, Nathalis Songo Vangu, who became full-time professor the following year, what was then known as Institut Supérieur Théologie Évangélique de Boma (ISTEB) began to offer pastoral training leading to an undergraduate degree. The arrival of Dr. Floyd Shank in 1979 gave a new impetus the seminary's academic programs, establishing a trend that  continued with the arrival of new professors, such as Arie Verduijn (1981), K. Bruce Edwards (1983), Esaron Lelo Mavinga (January 1986), Mabiala Justin-Robert Kenzo (October 1986), Louis Matundu Zulu (1986), Philippe Manzali Tsisi (1986), Claude Lendo Luyindula (1990), César Mata Ndudi (1991), Lydie Kwangu Seke (1991), Joseph Ngoma Nzita (1992), Véronique Mabiala Dikoba Ngoma (1992), Jérémie Khele Tsatu (1994), Nzuzi Mbenza (2000), Anastasie Masanga Mampoda (2004), and Gabriel Tsumbu Mayunda (2005).

The seminary has also greatly benefited from its roster of part-time and visiting professors such as Joachim Maduka Nzau, Joseph Mavinga Nzita, Timothée Taty Tshika, Justin Mayenda Ma Mbongo, Kitikila Dimonika, Nymi Panzu, Chris Braun, and Ron Brown.

Under the leadership of Dr. Nathalis Songo Vangu, its first African Rector, the seminary underwent a significant growth sprout. As an example, in June 1991, 11 men and women graduated from FACTEB.
Unfortunately, this growth would come to a virtual halt with the turmoil in the Congo during the nineties. Yet, it is also during this time that the seminary changed its status from a seminary to graduate school, offering both undergraduate and graduate degrees. This explains the change in the name of the institution, from Institut Supérieur de Théologie Évangélique de Boma (ISTEB) to Faculté de Théologie Évangélique de Boma (FACTEB).

Academics
FACTEB offers undergraduate degree programs and master's degrees through on-campus study.

References
  Alliance Life magazine, Volume 111, Number 26, Dec 29, 1976 edition
  Alliance Life magazine, Volume 112, Number 10, May 18, 1977 edition
  Alliance Life magazine, Volume 118, Number 11, May 25, 1983 edition
  Alliance Life magazine, Volume 126, Number 11, May 22, 1991 edition
  Alliance Life magazine, Volume 131, Number 5, Feb 28, 1996 edition

Alliance World Fellowship seminaries and theological colleges